Chiloglottis gunnii, commonly known as the tall bird orchid, is a species of orchid endemic to Tasmania. It has two broad leaves and a single green to purplish brown flower with a line of erect calli with swollen heads along the mid-line of the labellum. It is widespread but mainly in coastal districts and most commonly in moist to wet forest.

Description

Taxonomy and naming
Chiloglottis gunnii was first formally described in 1840 by John Lindley and the description was published in his book The Genera and Species of Orchidaceous Plants.<ref name="Lindl.">{{cite book|last1=Lindley|first1=John|title=The Genera and Species of Orchidaceous Plants|date=1840|publisher=Ridgways|location=London|page=387|url=https://www.biodiversitylibrary.org/item/9889#page/399/mode/1up|accessdate=21 April 2018}}</ref> The specific epithet (gunnii'') honours Ronald Campbell Gunn, who collected the type specimen which was sent to William Jackson Hooker who forwarded it to Lindley.

Distribution and habitat
The tall bird orchid is widespread but uncommon, growing mostly in wet forest and coastal scrub.

References

External links 

gunnii
Orchids of Tasmania
Plants described in 1840